South Eastern Sydney and Illawarra Area Health Service (SESIAHS) was formed in 2005 from the amalgamation of the Illawarra Area Health Service and South Eastern Sydney Area Health Service. It was disbanded on 1 January 2011 as part of the National Health Reform and creation of Local Hospital Networks. It was a statutory body of the New South Wales Government, operating under the NSW Department of Health, charged with the provision of public health services in eastern and southern Sydney, and regions to the south of Sydney. The area's Area Health Advisory Council was headed by Bob Farnsworth.

Major facilities

Eastern hospital network
 Prince of Wales Hospital
 Royal Hospital for Women
 Sydney Children's Hospital
 Sydney Hospital and Sydney Eye Hospital

Central hospital network
 Garrawarra Centre
 St George Hospital
 Sutherland Hospital

Southern hospital network
 Bulli Hospital
 Coledale Hospital
 David Berry Hospital
 Kiama Hospital and Community Health Service
 Milton-Ulladulla Hospital
 Port Kembla Hospital
 Shellharbour Hospital
 Shoalhaven District Memorial Hospital
 Wollongong Hospital

Affiliated health organisations
 Calvary Healthcare Kogarah
 St Vincent's Hospital
 War Memorial Hospital

Lord howe island
 Gower Wilson Memorial Hospital

See also
 List of hospitals in Australia

Notes

External links
 South Eastern Sydney and Illawarra Area Health Service website

Government agencies of New South Wales
Medical and health organisations based in New South Wales
Healthcare in Sydney